The following are the national records in track cycling in Chile maintained by its national cycling federation, Federación Ciclista de Chile.

Men

Women

References

External links
 Federación Ciclista de Chile

Chile
Records
Track cycling
track cycling